Born to Shine is an ITV entertainment programme which featured celebrities who learn a new skill taught to them by talented teenagers, live on Sunday evenings. The show was presented by Natasha Kaplinsky and won by Jason Manford.

Format
Teenagers teach celebrities a new talent to perform on the Born to Shine stage. Every week three celebrities perform, in an attempt to make it through to the final. Denise van Outen and Jason Gardiner give their opinions to the celebrities before the lines open for the public to vote for their favourite. All of the money raised goes to Save the Children, of which Kaplinsky is an ambassador.

Episodes

International versions 
The TV format was exported in Italy with the title Altrimenti ci arrabbiamo when it was aired on Rai 1 and hosted by Milly Carlucci on 2013.

External links

2011 British television series debuts
2011 British television series endings
2010s British reality television series
English-language television shows
ITV (TV network) original programming
Television series by ITV Studios